Mauricio Pereira Braz de Oliveira (born 9 December 1989), known better as Mauricinho, is a Brazilian beach soccer player who plays as a forward. He won the 2017 FIFA Beach Soccer World Cup representing Brazil and claimed the Silver Ball (second best player) award at the competition; he has also appeared at two other World Cups (2015, 2019). In addition, he was named the best player in the world at the 2017 Beach Soccer Stars awards.

Biography
Mauricinho began playing beach soccer competitively in 2010; he was spotted by Brazilian beach soccer legend, Júnior Negão, playing with friends on Copacabana Beach and was subsequently invited to play for Vasco da Gama.

He was first called up to the Brazilian national team in 2012. Mauricinho began to thrive under the leadership of coach Gilberto Costa, post-2015. This rise peaked in 2017 when he was voted by fellow players and coaches as the best player in the world; this followed being declared the second best player of that year's World Cup in the Bahamas in which he scored a brace in Brazil's win in the final over Tahiti. He was also the top scorer in Beach Soccer Worldwide competitions that year, with 54 goals.

He made his 100th appearance for Brazil in an 8–2 win against Oman at the 2019 World Cup.

As well as continuing to play for Vasco da Gama and winning the Copa Libertadores with the club, outside of Brazil, as is typical of top beach soccer players, Mauricinho has played for numerous clubs in Europe. In 2017, he joined top Portuguese side, Braga, and immediately won the Euro Winners Cup (EWC). In 2018, he switched to Russian rivals Kristall. Reaching the 2018 EWC final against his former Iberian club, he missed the crucial attempt in the penalty shootout, handing Braga the victory. He redeemed himself in the 2020 edition when, in a repeat of the 2018 final, Mauricinho scored to help Kristall become European champions.

Statistics

County

Club

Honours
The following is a selection, not an exhaustive list, of the major international honours Mauricinho has achieved:

Country
FIFA Beach Soccer World Cup
Winner (1): 2017
World Beach Games
Winner (1): 2019
Intercontinental Cup
Winner (2): 2016, 2017
CONMEBOL qualifiers for the FIFA Beach Soccer World Cup
Winner (3): 2015, 2017, 2019
Copa América
Winner (1): 2016
Mundialito
Winner (2): 2016, 2017
South American Beach Games
Winner (1): 2019
South American Beach Soccer League
Winner (2): 2017, 2018

Club
Euro Winners Cup
Winner (3): 2017, 2020, 2021
Runner-up (1): 2018
Euro Winners Challenge
Winner (1): 2018
Copa Libertadores
Winner (2): 2016, 2017

Individual
FIFA Beach Soccer World Cup (1):
Silver Ball: 2017

Beach Soccer Stars (2):
World's best player: 2017
World dream team: 2017

Mundialito (1):
Top scorer: 2017

Euro Winners Cup (4):
Best player: 2017, 2018, 2020, 2021

Copa Libertadores (1):
Best player: 2016

References

External links
Mauricinho, profile at Brazilian Beach Soccer Confederation (in Portuguese)
Mauricio Pereira Braz de Oliveira, profile at Beach Soccer Worldwide
Mauricinho, profile at ZeroZero.pt (in Portuguese)
Mauricinho, profile at Beach Soccer Russia (in Russian)

1989 births
Living people
Brazilian beach soccer players
People from Rio de Janeiro (city)